Vinařice is a municipality and village in Kladno District in the Central Bohemian Region of the Czech Republic. It has about 2,100 inhabitants.

Economy
Vinařice is known for its prison house. As of 2021, it employed 370 people and its capacity was 854 prisoners.

Sights
The most significant sight is the Mining open-air museum, located in the former Mayrau Mine.

Gallery

References

External links

Villages in Kladno District